Oh Snap is Christian rock band Philmont's major label debut EP. It was digitally released on August 19, 2008, and was released to retail stores on April 21, 2009, with "The Ascension" included.  It was produced by Rob Hawkins in Nashville, Tennessee, except for "The Ascension", which was produced by former Philmont bassist Matthew Arcaini. "The Difference" placed on the X 2009 Christian Rock Hits compilation as a bonus track.

Track listing
 "I Can't Stand to Fall"
 "The Difference"
 "Another Name"
 "My Hippocratic Oath"
 "Photosynthetic"
 "The Ascension" - only included on 2009 release

Note: Track 5 is a re-recording of the song "Murder & Photography", from the band's independent Photosynthetic EP.  Only the 2009 release of Oh Snap includes "The Ascension", a re-arrangement of a song by the same name from the Photosynthetic EP.

Band
Scott McTaube- vocals and rhythm guitar
Josiah Prince - guitar, piano and background vocals
Justin Sams -bass and background vocals
Todd Davis - drums and percussion

References

2008 EPs
Philmont (band) albums
Christian rock EPs